Alexander Gardner (1877 – 1952) was a Scottish professional footballer who played as a right half.

Career
Born in Leith, Gardner played for local club Leith Athletic then moved to Newcastle United at the end of 1899, making over 300 appearances in the English Football League and FA Cup over the next decade. He won three League titles: 1904–05, 1906–07 and 1908–09 (plus the 1907 Sheriff of London Charity Shield in 1907), and played in three FA Cup finals in 1905, 1906 and 1908, though finishing on the losing side in all of them; he had retired through injury by the time the club first claimed the trophy in 1910.

He played in the Home Scots v Anglo-Scots annual international trial match on four occasions, but despite his consistent success at club level was never selected for Scotland.

References

1877 births
1952 deaths
Scottish footballers
Leith Athletic F.C. players
Newcastle United F.C. players
Scottish Football League players
English Football League players
Association football wing halves
People from Leith
Footballers from Edinburgh
FA Cup Final players